Low Level Flight (also known as LLF) is a Canadian five-piece alternative rock band formed in 2006 in Toronto by lead singer Ryan Malcolm. They have released two albums so far: Urgency (2007) and Through These Walls (2011). LLF toured much of Canada, the US, Mexico and Asia in support of their debut album, which was produced by Mike Borkosky. The band had three top ten videos and two top 40 singles from the album. LLF spent much of 2010 writing and recording Through These Walls with acclaimed producer Gus van Go.  With distribution through Fontana North.

Past members include Mike Vanderzand, Simon Vanderzand who performed drums and guitar on Urgency album, Shaun Noronha and Ryan Gavel of No Warning. Noronha left the band after the birth of his son.

Formation
Ryan Malcolm released his debut solo album, Home in 2003, which was nominated for a Juno Award for Best Pop Album in 2004. In 2006, he formed Low Level Flight.

Career

Urgency (2007-09)
Low Level Flight released their debut album, Urgency on March 27, 2007. 
Three singles were released from the album: "Change for Me", "Say" and "Turnaround". "Say" was the highest-charting single from the album, peaking at No. 22 on the Canadian Hot 100 chart. All three songs were radio hits and all three corresponding videos hit number-one in Canada.

Earlier in 2006, LLF had embarked on their first tour of Canada to promote their debut record. They later toured Mexico and the United States.

In November 2007, LLF was named "CHUM Networks Emerging Artist". In December 2007, LLF were musical guests on the television show Canadian Idol alongside Hedley. They were invited to attend the 2008 MuchMusic Video Awards.

In July 2008, LLF opened for Bon Jovi for the band's Canadian Festival Date. In 2009, the band signed a deal with the Times of India and released their album in India, which was followed by a short tour in the country.

LLF recently played with Interpol at Toronto's Sound Academy to a sold out crowd of 3000+.

Through These Walls (2010-present)
LLF started working on their second album in early 2010. The album, titled Through These Walls, was released May 3, 2011, and saw the band garner top ten video and top 30 single in its first week of release. The band flew to Europe for their first tour of the UK that same release week. LLF played festivals throughout Canada and Europe in the summer of 2011.

Band members
Ryan Malcolm - lead vocals, acoustic guitar. 
James Rooke - rhythm guitar. 
Sebastien Duhaime  -   bass.
Hugh Allen - lead guitar. 
Brandon Merenick  - drums, percussion.

Former members
Shaun Noronha -  bass.
Dave Carter - lead guitar

Discography

Albums

Singles

Music videos

References

External links
 Low Level Flight official site
 Low Level Flight at Mateo Magazine

Musical groups established in 2006
Musical groups from Toronto
Canadian alternative rock groups
2006 establishments in Ontario